Titan Company Limited is an Indian company that mainly manufactures fashion accessories such as jewellery, watches and eyewear. Part of the Tata Group and started as a joint venture with the TIDCO, the company has its corporate headquarters in Electronic City, Bangalore, and registered office in Hosur, Tamil Nadu.

Titan company commenced operations in 1984 under the name Titan Watches Limited. In 1994, Titan diversified into jewellery with Tanishq and subsequently into eyewear with Titan Eyeplus. In 2005, it launched its youth fashion accessories brand Fastrack. The company is the largest branded jewellery maker in India, with more than 80% of its total revenues coming from the jewellery segment. As of 2022, Titan has a 6% market share in India's jewellery market. As of 2019, it is also the fifth-largest watch manufacturer in the world.

History

1984–1990
Titan Company Limited was inaugurated on 26 July 1984 under the name Titan Watches Limited in Chennai. A plant was set up to manufacture quartz analog electronic watches in the State Industries Promotion Corporation of Tamil Nadu, Ltd. Industrial area at Hosur. In November 1986, Titan Company and Casio signed a MoU proposing to manufacture 2 million digital and analog-digital watches. In 1989, a satellite case plant was set up in Dehradun, Uttarakhand at present with a manufacturing capacity of 500,000 watch cases annually.

1991–2000
In September 1993, the company changed its name to Titan Industries Ltd. as it ventured into other range of products other than watches.

In 1994, Titan launched its jewellery brand Tanishq.

In 1998, the company launched its watch & accessories brand, Fastrack, targeted at a younger audience in a bid to compete with Timex.

2001–2010
In 2001, Titan launched kids’ watches brand, Dash. The brand saw poor performance and was discontinued in 2003. In 2004, the company entered into an agreement with Moet Hennessy Louis Vuitton Group, to service the latter's range of watches in India through its customer care centres. In 2005, Fastrack was positioned as an independent accessory brand targeting the urban youth. With the objective to become a fashion brand, Fastrack launched sunglasses in the same year and launched bags, belts and wallets in 2009.

2011–present

Titan acquired Swiss watch maker Favre-Leuba in 2011 to enter the European market. In 2013, Titan entered the fragrances segment with the brand Skinn and later that year, it ventured into the helmets category under its brand Fastrack. In the same year, it changed its name to Titan Company Ltd. In 2014, it entered into a joint venture with Montblanc to establish its retail stores in India.

In 2016, Titan opened prescription lens manufacturing facilities in Noida, Kolkata, and Mumbai to improve its order processing time. In 2018, Titan merged its jewellery brand, Gold Plus targeted at customers in South India with Tanishq to establish the brand's presence in South.

Taneira is an ethnic wear brand from Titan that retails hand-woven sarees from different weaving clusters of India.  The brand was launched in 2016.  The first retail store was opened in Bengaluru in 2017 with more stores followed in New Delhi and Hyderabad.

Also, Titan announced recently (during the last quarter of 2016) about launching a series of affordable smartwatches under its brands like Sonata and Fastrack soon.

In 2016, Titan entered the wearable devices market by introducing its smartwatch, Juxt, made through a collaboration with Hewlett Packard. In 2017, the company launched a fitness tracker, named Gesture Band under its youth accessories brand, Fastrack. In the same year, it invested $3 million in a Singapore based wearable tech company, CoveIoT. In 2018, the company added new fitness tracker bands. The company had a 7.4% market share in the wearable devices market as of 2018.

In November 2020, Titan opened its first overseas Tanishq store in Dubai as well as an exclusive website for Dubai showcasing its collections.

Products

Watches

The watches division comprises brands Fastrack, Sonata, Raga, Nebula, Octane and Xylys. In 2011, the company secured licence for marketing and distribution of Tommy Hilfiger and Hugo Boss watches. Favre Leuba was incorporated in 2012. In 2018, the division accounted for ₹2,126 crore in revenue which was 10% of the total of the company.

Eyewear 
In 2007, Titan Industries forayed into the fashion accessories industry with the launch of sunglasses. It introduced Titan Eye Plus that makes frames, contact lenses, prescription eyewear, and sunglasses. The division accounted for ₹415 crore in FY 2016-17 maintaining a stable growth of 8%.

Jewellery 
Xerxes Desai started the brand Tanishq in 1995. Zoya was launched in the luxury segment, while Mia, a sub-brand was under Tanishq for work-wear jewellery. Titan's total revenue grew 20.44% in 2017-18 to ₹15,656 crore, of which jewellery sales fetched ₹13,036 crore. In 2016, Titan invested in CaratLane. As of 2022, Titan has a 6% market share in India's jewellery market.

Perfume 
In 2013, Titan launched six variants of perfume in the Indian perfume market under the brand name ‘Skinn’. They collaborated with world-renowned perfumers including Alberto Morillas and Olivier Pescheux.

Subsidiaries and affiliate companies

Titan Engineering & Automation Limited is a wholly owned subsidiary of Titan. It was formerly known as Titan-Precision Engineering Division. The company now deals in machine building, automation and component manufacturing.

Swiss watchmaker, Favre Leuba, was acquired in 2011 and incorporated as a subsidiary of Titan in 2012. The company was acquired for €2 million. Its headquarters in Solothurn, Switzerland.

Titan acquired a 62% stake in CaratLane 2016 for $50 million.

Titan Watch Company Limited, Hong Kong, is currently a 100% subsidiary of Favre Leuba AG, Switzerland.

In 2015, Titan entered a joint venture to sell products of Swiss luxury brand Montblanc through its retail outlets. Titan's equity share in Montblanc India Retail Private Limited is 49% and Montblanc Services B.V. holds 51%.

Board of directors/senior management

Awards and recognition
Titan Company is awarded in many national and international forums for various activities and categories.

Corporate
 Selected as Best Employer for National Award for the Empowerment of Persons with Disabilities 2014 by the government of India
 Titan ranked among the 100 most sustainable corporations in Asia in the Channel News Asia Sustainability Ranking 2014
 Top Indian Company award under the Gems and Jewellery Sector at the Dun & Bradstreet Corporate awards, 2014
 "Hall of Fame" award at 12th Franchisee Awards 2014 by Franchisee India
Watches
 Award at the CII 24th Kaizen national awards for assembly casing team
 Good Design Award 2014 by design Council of Japan for Skeletal Edge
 "Best Product design of the year-Watches & Jewellery" award by Red Dot for Skeletal Edge for 2014
 Bronze medal at the Indian Effies Award for Fastrack
Jewellery
 "Most Admired retailer of the year" award in Jewellery Category by Images Retail Awards
 Tanishq wins Global Awards for Excellence in Quality Management & Leadership by World Quality Congress
 Tanishq is the first Indian Brand to enter the list of top 30 Best Retail Brands in Asia Pacific and stands at # 13 as per Interbrand

Eyewear
 Award for Customer service excellence at Golden Globe Tigers Award
 Gold & Silver Awards at TRRAIN (Trust for Retailers and Retail Associates of India) Retail Awards
 Gold Award in the Outdoor Advertising Convention 2014

Precision engineering
 Hosur won three State Safety Awards announced by Tamil Nadu Government in 2013

Social initiatives
In 2018, as part of their corporate social responsibility the company sponsored entrepreneur and skater Rana Uppalapati’s mission titled Titan ECHO (Educate to Carry Her Onwards), to raise support for the education of 25,000 girl children in India.

References

External links

 Titan Watches India

Watchmaking conglomerates
Indian jewellery designers
Companies based in Chennai
Indian companies established in 1984
Manufacturing companies established in 1984
Watch brands
Indian brands
Watch manufacturing companies of India
Eyewear companies of India
Eyewear brands of India
Companies based in Bangalore
NIFTY 50
BSE SENSEX
Titan Company
1984 establishments in Karnataka
Companies listed on the National Stock Exchange of India
Companies listed on the Bombay Stock Exchange